Nikolai Lobachevsky (1792–1856) was a Russian mathematician.

Lobachevsky (Лобачевский ; also Lobachevskij and Lobachevskiy; feminine: Lobachevskaya), a Russian-language surname, may also refer to:

 1858 Lobachevskij, a main-belt asteroid
 N. I. Lobachevsky State University of Nizhny Novgorod or Lobachevsky University, Novgorod Oblast, Russia
 Lobachevskiy (crater), a crater on the moon
 Lobachevsky Prize, including the Lobachevsky Medal
 Lobachevsky function, also called the Clausen function
 "Lobachevsky" (song), a humorous song by Tom Lehrer
 Lobachevskian or hyperbolic geometry

See also 
 Łobaczewski (surname), the Polish-language equivalent of the surname